Stati Vasilev Statev is a Bulgarian scientist, economist and mathematician, and professor at University of National and World Economy. He is the rector of that same university since December 19, 2011.

Biography
Prof. Statev was born on June 19, 1955 in Bourgas, Bulgaria. He graduated from the National High School of Mathematics in Sofia in 1974. He continued his education  at the Higher Institute of Economics "Karl Marx" (today University of National and World Economy), where he graduated in "Political Economy" (1976 - 1980) and "Mathematics" at Sofia University (1981-1984). He is a doctor of Economic Sciences since 1987.  Since November 1980 Stati Statev worked in the Higher Institute of Economics "Karl Marx", renamed the University of National and World Economy. He was also
visiting professor at Boston University - between April and June 1990 and between June and August 1991.
World Bank consultant - between June and September 1990.
He has also lectured at the New Bulgarian University in Sofia and the University of Piraeus, Greece. He has more than 180 scientific publications in Bulgarian, English, Russian, Polish, Greek, Serbian and Albanian.

See also

References 

1955 births
Living people
20th-century Bulgarian economists
University of National and World Economy alumni
Karl Marx Higher Institute of Economics alumni
21st-century Bulgarian economists
Academic staff of the University of National and World Economy